André Lotterer (born 19 November 1981) is a German professional racing driver currently racing for Avalanche Andretti Formula E in the FIA Formula E Championship. He is best known for his success in endurance racing with the works Audi team, including three victories in the 24 Hours of Le Mans and the drivers' title of the FIA World Endurance Championship. He has also competed in the Japanese Super Formula series for over a decade, winning the title in 2011.

Twelve years later, he joined Caterham, replacing Kamui Kobayashi at the 2014 Belgian Grand Prix.

Racing career

Early life
Lotterer was born in Duisburg to a German-Peruvian father, Henri Lotterer, and a Belgian mother. He was raised by his Belgian mother in Nivelles. He competes with a Belgian racing licence, yet opts to represent Germany.

Single-seaters
Lotterer succeeded in both German and British Formula 3 Championships en route to being named Jaguar Racing's Formula One test driver in 2002. He was passed up for a race seat in 2003 with Eddie Irvine retiring and Pedro de la Rosa leaving, as the team chose Mark Webber and Antônio Pizzonia instead.

Lotterer contested a one-off Champ Car event at the end of 2002 for Dale Coyne, scoring a point at the Autódromo Hermanos Rodríguez Circuit. After that, he moved to Japan, winning both the Super GT Championship in 2006 and 2009 as well as the Formula Nippon (currently known as Super Formula) Championship in 2011.

Lotterer made his debut in the FIA Formula E Championship at the start of the 2017-18 season, with the DS Techeetah Formula E Team and is currently driving for Tag Heuer Porsche Formula-E team.

Sportscars
Lotterer also made his debut in the 2009 24 Hours of Le Mans, as a race week fill-in driver for the Kolles privateer Audi team. Lotterer and co-driver Charles Zwolsman Jr., also a Le Mans rookie, drove the entire race themselves after third driver Narain Karthikeyan dislocated his shoulder in a non-racing related injury. Driving an Audi R10, the car that won the 2006, 2007 and 2008 Le Mans races, Lotterer and Zwolsman finished 7th overall and in the LMP1 class.

His impressive performance that year earned him a drive with the works Audi Sport team in the 2010 24 Hours of Le Mans, driving the new Audi R15 TDI plus. Along with Marcel Fässler and Benoît Tréluyer, he finished 2nd overall and in the LMP1 class, despite the rival Peugeot 908s dominating for the first part of the race.

He remained with Audi Sport to compete in the 2011 24 Hours of Le Mans, co-driving the newly designed Audi R18 with Marcel Fässler and Benoît Tréluyer. After the Audi works team lost two out of three cars due to accidents, Lotterer and his co-drivers held off three works Peugeot 908s to claim both 1st place in the LMP1 class and the overall victory, beating the 2nd place Peugeot by a mere 13 seconds. This win gave Audi 10 overall victories at Le Mans and Lotterer his first overall win at Le Mans.

From 2012 to 2016, Lotterer competed in the FIA World Endurance Championship, driving for Audi Sport Team Joest with the Audi R18.

After Audi Sport Team Joest decided not to run in WEC for 2017, Lotterer moved to Porsche as the driver of the No. 1 car with 2016 World champion Neel Jani and Nick Tandy.

Lotterer returned to the series in 2023, joining Porsche's Hypercar effort alongside Kévin Estre and Laurens Vanthoor in the #6 entry. After last competing in the series in 2019, Lotterer stated that he felt like "a stranger" after almost four years away.

Formula One

Jaguar (2002)
Lotterer was the reserve driver for Jaguar Racing in the 2002 Formula One season. He also tested Jaguar F1 cars from 2000 to 2003.

Caterham (2014)
He replaced Caterham F1 driver Kamui Kobayashi for a one-off race at the 2014 Belgian Grand Prix. He qualified 21st place, in front of teammate Marcus Ericsson, but his race lasted just one lap before a mechanical failure put an abrupt end to his F1 debut. He was invited to race again at the Italian Grand Prix, but declined as the team planned to run Roberto Merhi in the car for the first practice session, contrary to his desire to take part in all the available running due to his lack of experience.

Formula E

Techeetah 
Lotterer joined Formula E with Techeetah in 2017, partnering Jean-Éric Vergne. After a disastrous Hong Kong weekend, where he was disqualified in race 1 and finished 13th in race 2 and a forgettable Marrakesh, Lotterer made his first podium in 2018 Santiago ePrix after battling with his teammate Vergne. They helped the team achieve the first 1-2 finish for a team in Formula E, although during the race it looked as though they could have blown it. A charging Lotterer drove into the back of Vergne late in the race and the team were not aware due to a power issue in the paddock. He finished third in 2018 Rome ePrix. He finished the 2017–18 season 8th with 64 points.

Lotterer nearly won the 2019 Hong Kong ePrix after leading most laps in the race. He was hit by Sam Bird in the second last lap which lead to his puncture and caused him to finish the race in 14th.  In 2019 Rome ePrix he claimed his first pole position in Formula E. He finished the race second after Jaguar's Mitch Evans. The season finished with 4 consecutive races without points, ending the season 8th with 86 points, while his team-mate Jean-Éric Vergne won the championship for a second year.

Porsche Formula E Team

2019–20 season 

Lotterer joined newcomer team TAG Heuer Porsche Formula E Team on 17 July 2019, partnering Neel Jani. António Félix da Costa was announced as his replacement at Techeetah. He made his debut with Porsche at Diriyah finishing 2nd in round 1, and finishing 14th in round 2. Lotterer secured pole for the Mexico City E-Prix, although lost the lead into the first corner and later on retired from the race. Lotterer scored a second place finish in the first of six races in Berlin, and ended the season in 8th with 71 points.

2020–21 season 

Lotterer stayed with Porsche for season 7 and his only podium finish was in the second race in Valencia, which was a second place. Both of the Porsche drivers were disqualified from the first race in Puebla after the team didn't declare the race tyres. Lotterer had finished in 16th, although his team-mate Wehrlein had crossed the finish line first. Lotterer finished the season in 17th with 58 points.

2021–22 season 

After 10 races, Lotterer had a second place in Mexico City and is currently 7th with 59 points.

Andretti Autosport

2022–23 season 
Lotterer was set to depart Formula E at the end of the 2021–22 season. However, he instead signed with Andretti Autosport to partner Jake Dennis and replace the outgoing Oliver Askew.

Personal life 
As of 2004, Lotterer resided in Tokyo, Japan. He has since moved to Monaco and often visits Nivelles, Belgium, the town he was raised in, as well as his hometown Renningen. Lotterer's hobbies outside of racing include cycling, collecting and driving classic cars, photography, driving buggies, and discovering unique foods. Lotterer is close friends with Jean-Éric Vergne, his teammate from 2017 to 2019, and is also friends with former racing driver - turned Audi Sport ABT Schaffler team principal, Allan McNish.

Racing record

Career summary

* Season still in progress.

Complete CART/Champ Car results
(key) (Races in bold indicate pole position; races in italics indicate fastest lap)

Complete Formula Nippon/Super Formula results
(key) (Races in bold indicate pole position; races in italics indicate fastest lap)

Complete JGTC/Super GT results
(key) (Races in bold indicate pole position; races in italics indicate fastest lap)

Complete 24 Hours of Le Mans results

Complete FIA World Endurance Championship results
(key) (Races in bold indicate pole position; races in italics indicate fastest lap)

* Season still in progress.

Complete Formula One results
(key) (Races in bold indicate pole position; races in italics indicate fastest lap)

Complete Formula E results
(key) (Races in bold indicate pole position; races in italics indicate fastest lap)

References

External links

 
 

1981 births
Living people
Sportspeople from Duisburg
Racing drivers from North Rhine-Westphalia
German racing drivers
German Formula One drivers
German people of Peruvian descent
German people of Belgian descent
Belgian people of Peruvian descent
Belgian people of German descent
Karting World Championship drivers
British Formula Three Championship drivers
German Formula Three Championship drivers
Formula BMW ADAC drivers
Formula Nippon drivers
Super Formula drivers
Champ Car drivers
Super GT drivers
24 Hours of Le Mans drivers
24 Hours of Le Mans winning drivers
European Le Mans Series drivers
FIA World Endurance Championship drivers
Blancpain Endurance Series drivers
24 Hours of Spa drivers
Caterham Formula One drivers
Formula E drivers
RC Motorsport drivers
Opel Team BSR drivers
Dale Coyne Racing drivers
Nakajima Racing drivers
TOM'S drivers
Kolles Racing drivers
Audi Sport drivers
Team Joest drivers
Techeetah drivers
Rebellion Racing drivers
Porsche Motorsports drivers
Porsche Formula E Team drivers
FIA GT Championship drivers
W Racing Team drivers
Jaguar Racing drivers
Toyota Gazoo Racing drivers
Nürburgring 24 Hours drivers
Andretti Autosport drivers
Phoenix Racing drivers
German expatriate sportspeople in Japan
German expatriate sportspeople in Monaco
Team Penske drivers